Bare Butte is a summit in Wichita County, Texas, in the United States.

Bare Butte was named for one Mr. Barre, an early settler and prospector.

References

Landforms of Wichita County, Texas
Mountains of Texas